Clerget-Blin (full name being Société Clerget-Blin et Cie) was a French precision engineering company formed in 1913 by the engineer and inventor Pierre Clerget and industrialist Eugène Blin. In 1939, the company was absorbed into the Groupe d'étude des moteurs à huile lourde (GEHL; "Diesel Engine Study Group"), which was further merged into SNECMA in 1947.

Products

The Clerget-Blin company mainly produced aircraft engines, their successful rotary engine designs were also built in Britain by companies such as Gwynnes Limited, Ruston Proctor and Gordon Watney, to increase the output in the times of World War I.

See also

List of aircraft engine manufacturers

Notes

Bibliography

 Gunston, Bill. World Encyclopaedia of Aero Engines. Cambridge, England. Patrick Stephens Limited, 1989. 
 Lumsden, Alec. British Piston Engines and their Aircraft. Marlborough, Wiltshire: Airlife Publishing, 2003. .

Defunct aircraft engine manufacturers of France
Manufacturing companies established in 1913
1913 establishments in France
Manufacturing companies disestablished in 1947
1947 disestablishments in France